AS Labruna is an Italian marine engine manufacturer and dealer of engines for road transport and aircraft based in Monopoli (Apulia).

Company
AS Labruna is a company founded in 1971 and produces and markets marine diesel engines, marine generators, marine propulsion systems and marine cranes.
Marine is the unit that manufactures and markets marine diesel engines, marine generators, marine propulsion systems and marine cranes; Power is the section dedicated to the design and marketing of industrial diesel engines, vehicles and generators; The Loading sector deals with the marketing and installation of cranes, truck loaders and aerial platforms. In addition to its product line, AS Labruna is an official distributor for other companies.

Distribution
AS Labruna is an official distributor for the following companies:
 FPT (FIAT Powertrain Technologies formerly IVECO Aifo) for diesel engines and generators
 Ing. Bonfiglioli for cranes
 FNM Marine Diesel Engine
 VM Motori

See also
 FNM Marine
 Inboard motor

References

Propulsion
Marine engineering
Italian brands
Companies based in Apulia
Engine manufacturers of Italy